Miller Anderson may refer to:

 J. Miller Anderson & Co., an Adelaide, South Australia, retail drapery business
 Miller Anderson (musician) (born 1945), British blues guitarist and singer
 Miller Anderson (diver) (1922–1965), American diver